"Isto É Bom" ("This Is Good") is a song written by Xisto Bahia and released by singer Baiano in 1902, through Casa Edison, labeled as Zonophone. This song is considered by many Brazilian music specialists as the first recorded song in Brazil.

References 

Portuguese-language songs
Brazilian songs
1902 songs